Gazan Khvast (also Romanized as Gazān Khvāst; also known as Gazān Khodāst, Jazānkhāş, and Jazān Khvāş) is a village in Rigan Rural District, in the Central District of Rigan County, Kerman Province, Iran. At the 2006 census, its population was 546, in 111 families.

References 

Populated places in Rigan County